Newark Venture Partners (NVP) is a global venture capital and early stage accelerator in Newark, New Jersey focusing on technology startups. The NVP Labs are located at facilities of the Rutgers Business School at One Washington Park.

History

NVP Fund I
In July 2015, Don Katz and other co-founders announced a formation of Newark Venture Partners through its sister entity Newark Venture Accelerator, LLC. with a target of $50 million to fund technology startups in Newark. The plan was to accept applications from startup founders in October 2015. By May 2016, it raised $23 million from Audible, Prudential Financial, Dun & Bradstreet and other backers. The fund intended to invest $10 million per year for 5 years.

In 2016, the fund announced its inaugural lab accelerator class. NVP provided one-year free office space, professional development and an investment up to $100K to each of its lab class companies. The first lab class consisted of 9 companies out of 650 applicants. NVP planned to support two lab classes each year.

By October 2021, NVP invested $42 million in 97 portfolio companies., including AeroFarms.

NVP Fund II
NVP Fund II has a target at $100 million. Af of August 2021, it closed on $73.6 millions with 35 backers including Audible, Dun & Bradstreet, Fidelco Realty Group, Horizon Blue Cross Blue Shield of New Jersey, Panasonic Corporation of North America, Prudential Financial, RWJBarnabas Health, TD Bank, N.A., and New Jersey Economic Development Authority. The NVP Fund II started its investment in 2021.

References

Venture capital firms of the United States
Financial services companies based in New Jersey
Startup accelerators
Companies based in Newark, New Jersey
Financial services companies established in 2015